Featuring Paul Gonsalves is an album by American jazz pianist, composer, and bandleader Duke Ellington. Without new material to work with, Ellington recorded the album with his orchestra and saxophonist Paul Gonsalves in 1962 during a four-hour recording session. It was not released until 1985 by Fantasy Records.

Critical reception

Writing for Playboy, Robert Christgau said while his own tastes in jazz ran to bebop rather than Ellington's big band, Gonsalves' performance highly impressed him: "It goes without saying that Gonsalves shows more sonic and harmonic imagination than such R&B contemporaries (and heroes of my youth) as Lee Allen and Sam 'The Man' Taylor. The beauty is that he's not above outhonking them as well." The AllMusic review by Stephen Cook awarded the album four ouf of five stars and stated, "Gonsalves turns this one-off session into one of the more enjoyable titles in Ellington's catalog".

Track listing
All compositions by Duke Ellington except as indicated.
 "C Jam Blues" (Barney Bigard, Ellington) - 5:14  
 "Take the "A" Train" (Billy Strayhorn) - 5:43  
 "Happy Go Lucky Local" - 5:03  
 "Jam With Sam" - 3:18  
 "Caravan" (Ellington, Irving Mills, Juan Tizol) - 6:12  
 "Just A-Sittin' and A-Rockin'" (Ellington, Lee Gaines, Strayhorn) - 4:49  
 "Paris Blues" - 3:30  
 "Ready, Go!" (Ellington, Strayhorn) - 5:01  
Recorded at A & R Studio, New York on May 1, 1962

Personnel
Duke Ellington – piano 
Ray Nance - cornet
Cat Anderson, Bill Berry, Roy Burrowes - trumpet
Lawrence Brown, Leon Cox - trombone
Chuck Connors - bass trombone
Jimmy Hamilton - clarinet, tenor saxophone
Johnny Hodges, Russell Procope - alto saxophone
Paul Gonsalves - tenor saxophone
Harry Carney - baritone saxophone
Aaron Bell - bass 
Sam Woodyard - drums

References

External links 
 

Fantasy Records albums
Duke Ellington albums
1962 albums